Roberto Pierno (born 14 February 2001) is an Italian professional footballer who plays as a defender for  club Virtus Francavilla, on loan from Lecce.

Club career
He joined youth squad of Lecce in the summer of 2018 and started receiving call-ups to the senior squad in January 2019. On 4 January 2020, he was loaned to Serie D club Bitonto.

He made his Serie B debut for Lecce on 8 November 2020 in a game against Virtus Entella. He substituted Luca Paganini in the 89th minute.

On 1 February 2021 he joined Serie C club Catanzaro on loan.

On 21 July 2021, he was loaned to Virtus Francavilla, again in Serie C. The loan was renewed for the 2022–23 season.

References

External links
 

2001 births
Footballers from Bari
Living people
Italian footballers
Association football defenders
U.S. Lecce players
U.S. Bitonto players
U.S. Catanzaro 1929 players
Virtus Francavilla Calcio players
Serie B players
Serie C players
Serie D players